Thomas Potts (1824–1888) was a British-born New Zealand naturalist, ornithologist, entomologist, and botanist.

Thomas Potts may also refer to:
Thomas Potts (clerk) (fl. 1612–1618), English law clerk, and the author of the Discoverie of Witches
Thomas Potts (writer) (1778–1842), English solicitor and writer
Thomas R. Potts (1810–1874), American physician, civic leader, and politician
Tommy Potts (1912–1988), Irish fiddle player and composer

Fictional characters
Tom Potts, the subject of a child ballad of the same name